Flemish architecture may refer to:
 Architecture of Belgium
 Architecture of the Netherlands

See also 
 Flemish (disambiguation)
 Flemish painting